Haug is an unincorporated community in Roseau County, in the U.S. state of Minnesota.

History
A post office called Haug was established in 1897, and remained in operation until 1931. The community was named for Theodore E. Haug, a Norwegian settler.

References

Unincorporated communities in Roseau County, Minnesota
Unincorporated communities in Minnesota